Wykroty may refer to the following places in Poland:
Wykroty, Lower Silesian Voivodeship (south-west Poland)
Wykroty, West Pomeranian Voivodeship (north-west Poland)